Where at Night the Wood Grouse Plays (1999) is the third album by the German symphonic folk/doom metal band Empyrium.

Track listing

 The song "When Shadows Grow Longer" is a new version of the same song from the 1997 Songs of Moors and Misty Fields album.

Personnel
 Ulf Theodor Schwadorf - vocals, guitars (acoustic), bass, drums
 Nadine Mölter - flute

Additional personnel
 Thomas Helm - vocals

References

1999 albums
Empyrium albums